Moss Hyles Kendrix (March 8, 1917 – January 4, 1989) was a public relations specialist. Of Kendrix’ various public relations and advertising campaigns, he is best known for his Coca-Cola company advertising in 1948.

He educated corporations about African-American consumers' buying power through to designing various public relations and advertising campaigns for African-Americans such as news organizations, entertainers, and corporate clients including Carnation, the Ford Motor Company, and the Coca-Cola company.

Biography

Early life
Moss Kendrix was born in Atlanta, Georgia, on March 8, 1917. He spent the majority of his early life in Atlanta.

College
Kendrix entered into Morehouse College and he served as the editor of the college newspaper The Maroon Tiger. He was a member of Alpha Phi Alpha fraternity and he was co-founder of Phi Delta Delta Journalism Society. It was the first society of its kind for African-American journalism students.

He transferred into Howard University School of Law in 1939. However, he went into workforce for work experience. At the same time, he married Dorothy Marie Johnson. They had two sons, Moss Kendrix, Jr. and Alan Kendrix.

Director
In 1941, Kendrix was drafted into the United States Army. He worked for the Treasury Department in the War Finance Office. In 1944, he became a director of public relations for the Republic of Liberia’s Centennial Celebration. It excited his passion and interest, and was the start of his public relations career.

The Moss Kendrix Organization
At the same year, Kendrix founded a public relations firm named The Moss Kendrix Organization. The company motto, "What the Public Thinks Counts!" was also his mantra, which he embossed on the organization's letterhead. It was established in Washington, DC. Kendrix focused on accounts pursuing African-American consumers such as Carnation, National Dental Association, National Education Association, the Republic of Liberia and Ford Motor Company to name a few.

One of his career highlights was the acquisition of Coca-Cola as a client. He focused on marketing to African Americans, and worked with Coca-Cola until the 1970s.

Death
Kendrix died of a heart ailment on January 4, 1989, at his home in Washington.
He was married to Muriel Kendrix of Lexington, Massachusetts.

Legacy and honors

Literary career
The Crisis (Nov. 1940). ' Forums in Georgia '

Politics

References

Notes

Citations

 The Museum of Public Relations : Moss Kendrix, The Museum of Public Relations
 

1917 births
1989 deaths
American public relations people
African-American businesspeople
20th-century American businesspeople
Businesspeople from Atlanta
Morehouse College alumni
Howard University School of Law alumni
20th-century African-American people